The 1902–03 Football League season was Small Heath Football Club's 11th in the Football League and their 8th in the Second Division. Having been relegated in 1901–02, they reached the top two positions by mid-November and remained there for the rest of the season, finishing as runners-up in the 18-team league, so were promoted back to the First Division at the first attempt. They also took part in the 1902–03 FA Cup, entering at the first round proper (round of 32) and losing in that round to Derby County. In locally organised competition, they lost to Aston Villa in the first round of the Birmingham Senior Cup after two replays.

Twenty-two players made at least one appearance in nationally organised first-team competition, and there were eleven different goalscorers. Archie Goldie was ever-present over the 35-match season, his full-back partner Harold Wassell missed only one match, and six other players made at least 30 appearances. Arthur Leonard was leading scorer with 16 goals, all of which came in the league. The 12–0 defeat of Doncaster Rovers in April equalled the club record highest win.

Football League Second Division

League table (part)

FA Cup

Appearances and goals

References
General
 Matthews, Tony (1995). Birmingham City: A Complete Record. Breedon Books (Derby). .
 Matthews, Tony (2010). Birmingham City: The Complete Record. DB Publishing (Derby). .
 Source for match dates and results: "Birmingham City 1902–1903: Results". Statto Organisation. Retrieved 23 May 2012.
 Source for lineups, appearances, goalscorers and attendances: Matthews (2010), Complete Record, pp. 250–51. Note that attendance figures are estimated.
 Source for kit: "Birmingham City". Historical Football Kits. Retrieved 22 May 2018.

Specific

Birmingham City F.C. seasons
Small Heath